Two-time defending champions Diede de Groot and Aniek van Koot defeated Yui Kamiji and Jordanne Whiley in the final, 7–6(7–2), 3–6, [10–8] to win the women's doubles wheelchair tennis title at the 2020 French Open.

Seeds

Draw

Finals

References

External Links
 Draw

Wheelchair Women's Doubles
French Open, 2020 Women's Doubles